The Virginia League was a Class D level minor baseball league based in Virginia that played in 1900. It was the second league to go by that name, succeeding the first edition of the Virginia League (1894–96) and preceding the Virginia League (1906–1928).

The 1900 Virginia League was composed entirely of teams from Virginia. The six–team league consisted of the Norfolk Mary Janes, Portsmouth Pirates, Newport News Shipbuilders and Richmond Colts, as well as teams in Hopewell and Petersburg.

In June, both Petersburg and Richmond disbanded. Following the 1900 season, the league became the Virginia-North Carolina League.

Hall of Famer Christy Mathewson played for the Norfolk Phenoms, leading Virginia League in wins and strikeouts.

1900 cities represented 
Hampton, VA: Hampton Crabs 
Newport News, VA: Newport News Shipbuilders 
Norfolk, VA: Norfolk Phenoms 
Petersburg, VA: Petersburg Farmers 
Portsmouth, VA: Portsmouth Boers 
Richmond, VA: Richmond Bluebirds

Standings & statistics
1900 Virginia League
 Petersburg disbanded June 11; Richmond disbanded June 13.

References

Baseball leagues in Virginia
Defunct minor baseball leagues in the United States